Garani is a village in the municipality of Kičevo, North Macedonia. It used to be part of the former municipality of Oslomej.

Demographics
According to the statistics of the Bulgarian ethnographer Vasil Kanchov from 1900, 400 inhabitants lived in Garani, all being Albanian Muslims. As of the 2021 census, Garani had 27 residents with the following ethnic composition:
Albanians 17
Persons for whom data are taken from administrative sources 10

According to the 2002 census, the village had a total of 542 inhabitants. Ethnic groups in the village include:
Albanians 541 
Macedonians 1

References

External links

Villages in Kičevo Municipality
Albanian communities in North Macedonia